The Adams CA-2 is a single seat, low-wing, American ultralight aircraft that was designed by Frank Griffith of Corning Aircraft around 1992 and was available as plans for amateur construction until 1999. In 1999, Hummel Aviation of Bryan, Ohio began offering the design. Although the design was well received, plans were no longer listed as being available from Hummel Aviation as of 2007.

In 2011, Adams Aeronautics Company of Dallas, Georgia, took over sales and support of the CA-2 design.

Development
The design goals of the CA-2 described a plans-built aircraft for the US FAR 103 Ultralight Vehicles category, including a maximum  empty weight. The CA-2 was also intended to be one of the lowest cost ways of obtaining an ultralight aircraft. At the time it entered the market, the airframe construction cost was estimated to be US$1600 and the total completion cost US$5000–6000. The price for the plans, consisting of 40 sheets of 11"X17" (28 X 43 cm), was US$150 in 2011.

The CA-2 requires about 600 hours to build. The airframe is of all-metal construction using 2024-T3 aluminum sheet, extruded angles and tubing, fastened primarily with stainless steel pop rivets. Construction requires normal hand tools, plus a small bending brake and a tube bender.

The fuselage and wings are of monocoque stressed skin construction. The wings include plain flaps and differential ailerons and are stressed to +4.4 and -2.2 g. The wings are removable by withdrawing three bolts. The control surfaces are made from aluminum tubing, are fabric covered and actuated by pushrods.

The landing gear is of conventional configuration with a steerable tailwheel linked to the rudder.

The prototype was powered by a Rotax 277. Heavier engines can be installed, although the aircraft will not then meet the US FAR 103 weight requirements as an ultralight aircraft. Other engines used include the  Rotax 447,  Rotax 377,  1/2 VW and the  Hirth F-33.

Specifications (CA-2)

See also

References

External links

1990s United States ultralight aircraft
Hummel Aviation aircraft